The Stairs is a Canadian documentary film by Hugh Gibson, released in 2016. The film, which premiered at the 2016 Toronto International Film Festival, centres on the clients and staff of StreetHealth, a harm reduction health clinic in the Regent Park area of Toronto.

The film was shot over a period of five years.

The film won the award for Best Canadian Film at the Toronto Film Critics Association Awards 2016. It was a finalist for Best Documentary Film, but did not win.

References

External links
 

2016 films
2016 documentary films
Canadian documentary films
Regent Park
Documentary films about Toronto
Documentary films about health care
Harm reduction
Films shot in Toronto
English-language Canadian films
Documentary films about poverty in Canada
2010s English-language films
2010s Canadian films